Giovanni Battista Calandra (1586 - c. 1644) was an Italian mosaic artist in the Vatican.

He was born at Vercelli in 1586. In the pontificate of Urban VIII, it was found that the dampness of St. Peter's materially affected canvases, and henceforth it was determined to remove the principal pictures, and to replace them with copies in mosaic, of which the first was executed by Calandra, after the St. Michael of Cesare D'Arpino. With this were The Four Doctors of the Church, St. Peter, St. Paul, and others in the cupolas, after the cartoons of D'Arpino, Romanelli, Lanfranco, Sacchi, and Pellegrini. He also executed a Madonna after Raphael for the Christina, Queen of Sweden.

References

1568 births
1640s deaths
People from Vercelli
16th-century Italian painters
Italian male painters
17th-century Italian painters
Mosaic artists